The Janasz Palace (Polish: Pałac Janaszów, Pałac Janaszów Czackich) is a historic building on ulica Zielna in Warsaw, Poland. 

It was built in 1870–80 for Jakub Janasz to a design by Jan Kacper Heurich.

It suffered little in World War II and is the best preserved palace in Warsaw from the second half of the nineteenth century. 
In 1970–73 the exterior and interior were restored to their original Neo-Baroque condition.

It is now headquarters to the Polish Monuments Conservation Works (Polskie Pracownie Konserwacji Zabytków).

References

Palaces in Warsaw